Arantxa Rus and Tamara Zidanšek were the reigning champions, but chose not to participate.

Erin Routliffe and Kimberley Zimmermann won the title, defeating Natela Dzalamidze and Kamilla Rakhimova in the final, 7–6(7–5), 4–6, [10–4].

Seeds

Draw

Draw

References

External Links
Main Draw

Internazionali Femminili di Palermo - Doubles
2021 Doubles